Liu Weijuan (born 28 February 1983) is a Chinese former professional tennis player. 
She won one doubles titles on the ITF Women's Circuit. Her career-high singles ranking is No. 490, achieved on 1 November 2004. Her career-high doubles ranking is No. 442, achieved on 4 October 2004.

Liu played at the 2005 Guangzhou International doubles event with Chen Yanchong but lost in the first round. She also played on some other WTA and ITF events.

ITF finals

Singles (0–2)

Doubles (1–1)

References
 
 

Chinese female tennis players
1983 births
Living people
21st-century Chinese women